Omi Gurung (born Sandeep Gurung), is an Indian fashion designer and social entrepreneur from Sikkim. He is popularly known as "The Green Man" of Sikkim.

Biography
Gurung was born and brought up in Sikkim. He is the youngest son of R.K. Gurung, former Secretary, Department of Mines, Minerals & Geology, Government of Sikkim and Beena Gurung.

Omi Gurung was one of the 50 voices of young environmentalists from South Asia and Southeast Asia in a global campaign "My Future, My Voice"  by Earth Day Network to mark the 50th Anniversary of Earth Day on 22 April 2020. Omi was featured as one of the "Defenders of the Planet Earth" in 12th anniversary issue (November 2018) of Eclectic Northeast  and featured on the cover page of Northeast Today (January 2018) as one of the "Reigning Champions". He was listed as one of the top seven well known personalities from Sikkim in the book  "Discover India- State by State" published (2018) by Penguin Books. He was also listed as one of the 50 Himalayan Heroes (Coolest People to know in Asia) by Conde Nast Traveller India in its 7th Anniversary Issue (October–November 2017).

Omi was a global climate consultant for the award winning animated film “Songs Of The Earth”. The film was previewed at UK prime minister’s office at No.10 Downing Street and Royal Albert Hall in London and premiered on 2 November 2021  at United Nations Conference,COP 26 in Glasgow Scotland.

Omi was conferred with national award "Karmaveer Chakra" instituted by United Nations and iCongo on 26 November 2019, in an event held at NCR, New Delhi. He received The Telegraph Northeast Excellence Award 2017 for his outstanding contribution towards the growth and development of the Northeast region of India. He was conferred with Balipara Foundation Young Naturalist Award 2016 for his contribution to sustainable fashion in the Eastern Himalayas. Gurung was one of TEDxTalk speakers for a TEDx event held on 8 October 2017 organised by Sikkim Manipal Institute of Technology under the licence of TED, making him the first TEDx speaker from Sikkim.

He has been featured in leading print media in India including The Hindu, DNA, The Times Of India, The Telegraph,   The Statesman, Femina, Condenast Traveller India, Business Today, Sanctuary Asia, Eclectic Northeast, The Assam Tribune, Assam Times, Talk Sikkim, Good News Sikkim, Sikkim Insight, Sikkim Express, Sikkim Mail, Summit Times, The New Indian Express, Deccan Herald, Deccan Chronicle, Midday, Vijay Times, Bangalore Mirror, Prajawani, Usha Kiran, Vijaya Next, Udayavani and Sikkim Mail.

Gurung has written on fashion and lifestyle related topics for some of the leading dailies in India and international journals. He carved a niche for himself in the fashion world at a young age. He was a founder of a Bangalore-based social group Oh My India (OMI) which catalysed change in the lifestyle of people in India by creating awareness to Reduce, Reuse and Recycle domestic waste and helping them to get started.

The designer is the owner of Green Gangtok eco-friendly fashion boutique, the first of its kind in Sikkim. The boutique houses an array of fashionable green choices in apparels, accessories and artefacts. The products are natural, upcycled and sustainable and fair. It is his attempt to promote the green trend and propagate sustainable consumption among urban consumers.

He was chosen as "Top Ten Cutest Vegetarian Next Door 2013" by PETA India. He was selected out of thousands of contestants from across India, making him the first cutest vegetarian from the North East to reach the final of the contest organized by People for the Ethical Treatments of Animals (PETA) India.

He was chosen as one of the Coolest North Easterners 2014 by the North East India webzine The Thumb Print as an effort to celebrate achievers from North East India and an exercise to recognise those who inspire others with their works.

Gurung was listed in the top 50 famous Indian fashion designers 2015 by JD Institute of Fashion Technology and as one of the men style icons from the Northeast by Eclectic North East magazine.

Education 
Gurung was educated at Holy Cross School in Tadong, Sikkim. He holds a fashion degree from Vogue Institute of Fashion Technology and a postgraduate diploma in journalism from Sri Sri Centre for Media Studies in Bangalore.

Awards and recognition 
Omi was felicitated as keynote speaker for a global campaign “One Billion Rising 2020 - Raise the Vibration, Rise for Revolution” by Impulse NGO Network and Siliguri Nari Shakti in an event held on 26 February 2020 in Siliguri, North Bengal, India.
He was conferred with national award "Karmaveer Chakra" instituted by United Nations and iCongo on 26 November 2019, in an event held at NCR, New Delhi
He was felicitated with the letter of appreciation by Gurung Community (Tamu Chaawtari) for his outstanding contribution to the community in Sikkim on 28 April 2019.
Omi was chosen as one of the youth icons of Sikkim by Election Commission of India for General Election 2019 and Lok Sabha Election 2019 to educate and to create awareness among people to cast their vote. 
TEDxTALK speaker at TEDxSMIT event on 8 October 2017 at Sikkim Manipal Institute of Technology, Rangpo.
One of the heroes (achievers) of Northeast at "Arunodoi Northeast Students and Youth Summit 2017" organized under the aegis of the State Level Advisory Committee for Students and Youth Welfare, Govt of Assam on 17 September 2017 at the IGNCA, New Delhi.
The recipient of The Telegraph Northeast Excellence Award 2017 (The Telegraph, ABP Group)
The recipient of Young Naturalist Award 2016 (Balipara Foundation)
Chosen as the Coolest Northeasterner 2014 (The Thumbprint)
He was a finalist in PETA India’s Cutest Vegetarian Next Door 2013.
Gurung's design collection "Integration- a new identity" won The Most Creative Collection Award at the Vogue Mystique Designer Awards, 2005–2006, which was presented by the film actress, dancer and former MP Vyjayantimala Bali.

Notes 

Indian male fashion designers
1986 births
Artists from Sikkim
Living people
Gurung people